Joe Martin may refer to:

Entertainment
Joe Martin (bassist), jazz musician
Joe Martin (cartoonist), American cartoonist
Joe Martin (writer) (born 1953), playwright, author and theatre director
Fiddlin' Joe Martin (1900–1975), American blues musician
Joe Martin, director of the 2016 Hungarian film Keep Quiet
Joe F. Martin, creator of the role-playing game Recon
Joe Martin, member of classical singing group Angelis
Joe Martin (All My Children), character on All My Children
Joe Martin (orangutan), silent movie animal performer

Politics
Joseph Martin (Canadian politician) (1852–1923), lawyer and politician known as "Fighting Joe"
Joseph W. Martin Jr. (1884–1968), speaker of U.S. House of Representatives

Sports
Joe Martin (outfielder) (1876–1964), American baseball player
Joe Martin (third baseman) (1911–1960), American baseball player and manager
Joe E. Martin (1916–1996), American boxing coach
Joe Martin (Irish footballer) (1931–2023), Irish footballer for Dundalk
Joe Martin (American football) (born 1983), linebacker for Baltimore Ravens
Joe Martin (footballer) (born 1989), English footballer for Northampton Town
Joe Martin (rugby league) (born 1995), English rugby league player

See also
Joe Martin Stage Race, a cycling stage race held annually in Fayetteville, Arkansas
Joseph Martin (disambiguation)
Joey Martin (disambiguation)